Jordan Palmer-Samuels (born 12 September 1994) is an English professional footballer who can play as either as a striker or a winger. He is currently a free agent having previously played in England and Cyprus.

Career
Palmer-Samuels joined the Arsenal Academy in October 2009 at the age of fifteen, after a short spell with Leyton Orient youth programme. He later joined in July 2011 Nottingham Forest on a 3-year deal where he was a regular for the under 18s.

In August 2013, Palmer-Samuels joined National League South side Hayes & Yeading United. He made his one and only appearance for the side 26 August 2013, playing 64 minutes in a 1–0 loss to Eastbourne Borough. He later played in Cyprus for Karmiotissa and EN Parekklisia.

Personal life
In 2017, Palmer-Samuels appeared in a Red Bull documentary series called The Streets Don't Lie alongside Djibril Cissé in a bid to earn a week-long trial with RB Leipzig.

References

External links

1994 births
Living people
English footballers
Expatriate footballers in Cyprus
Nikos & Sokratis Erimis FC players
Karmiotissa FC players
Enosis Neon Parekklisia FC players
English expatriate footballers
English expatriate sportspeople in Cyprus
Hayes & Yeading United F.C. players
Association football midfielders
Cypriot Second Division players